Nélida Haydeé "Nelly" Rivas (April 21, 1939 – August 28, 2012) was an Argentine woman known for having been romantically linked to Juan Domingo Perón, President of Argentina, between the years 1953-1955, a relationship that began when Rivas was 14 years old. The relationship was cited among the reasons for the overthrow and exile of Perón in 1955.

Early life
Nélida Haydeé Rivas was born on April 21, 1939, at the Rawson hospital in Buenos Aires, the only daughter of José María Rivas and María Sebastiana Viva. Rivas was a worker at the Noel confectionery factory and his wife worked as a caretaker in an apartment building.

Encounter with Perón 
As a teenager, she participated in the activities organized in the UES or Union of Secondary Students (female branch), a Peronist organization in which high school students met in the Presidential Residence at Olivos. At this time she met President Peron and became linked sentimentally, and sexually, with the Argentine president between the years 1953-1955, after the death of Evita Perón. At the time they first met she was either 13 or 14 years of age.

 This is how Nelly described her first face to face with Perón:

 Nelly told Zavala, according to what he says in his book.

Though much of Argentina's media had, since 1950, been either controlled or monitored by the administration, lurid pieces on his ongoing relationship with an underage girl, something Perón never denied, filled the gossip pages. Pressed by reporters on whether his supposed new paramour was, as the magazines claimed, thirteen years of age, the fifty-nine-year-old Perón responded that he was "not superstitious."

Life after Perón
When Perón was overthrown in September 1955, she was arrested with her family in the province of Chaco. During the military government calling itself the "Revolución Libertadora" (Liberating Revolution), her parents were convicted and confined in the Villa Devoto Prison, while Nelly was transferred to a Correctional Asylum for Minors.

The letters she exchanged with Perón were officially published in 1957 by a newspaper in the United States. The relationship was cited among the reasons for the overthrow of Perón in 1955, and following the overthrow, Perón was prosecuted for statutory rape, a crime that occurs when an adult maintains a consensual relationship with a minor; in Argentine law that is under 15 years of age (she was 14 when he started the relationship). The process prescribed in 1971 whilst Perón was negotiating with the de facto president Alejandro Agustín Lanusse the legalization of the Partido Justicialista.

Nelly married in 1958 and, in 1973, she reunited with Perón when he returned for his third presidency. Nelly at that time had two children.

She died on the 28th of August 2012 at the age of 73.

References

Bibliography
 Nuestro Siglo: Historia de la Argentina, Tomo 1949-1955 "Escándalos y Frivolidades". Director y autor de la obra: Félix Luna. Hyspamérica y Editorial Sarmiento S.A. (1992).
 Amor y Violencia: La verdadera historia entre Perón y Nelly Rivas. Del autor Juan Ovidio Zavala. Editorial Planeta (1987).
 Nelly R., la niña amante de Perón: Novela (anti)histórica. Del autor Santiago Giralt (1994).
 Las vírgenes de Perón. Del autor Ignacio Yrigoyen. Ediciones B (1990).

1939 births
2012 deaths
People from Buenos Aires
Mistresses
20th-century Argentine women